Lamy station is an Amtrak station at Santa Fe County Road 33, 152 Old Lamy Trail in Lamy, New Mexico, United States. It is served by the Southwest Chief. Until 2014, it was the southern terminus for the Santa Fe Southern Railway. The station was built in 1909 by the Atchison, Topeka and Santa Fe Railway.

Since the 1960s, the station has also served as the intercity link for the state capital of Santa Fe,  to the north. Motorcoaches operating under the Amtrak Thruway brand, shuttle passengers between Lamy station, Santa Fe, with service continuing onto Los Alamos.

History 
The one-story Lamy depot was built for the Atchison, Topeka and Santa Fe Railway in 1909, replacing a two-story wood-frame structure erected in 1881. When the new passenger station opened, the original was converted into a freight depot and served this purpose into the 1940s.

The Santa Fe originally planned to run from Atchison, Kansas., to Santa Fe, and then west to California. As the track-building advanced into New Mexico, the civil engineers realized that the terrain around Santa Fe made this an impossible undertaking. The line was built through Lamy instead, and a spur line was built northward to Santa Fe.

East of the depot, the Fred Harvey Company constructed a hotel named El Ortiz in 1910. El Ortiz closed in 1942 and was later demolished.

In popular culture 
The Lamy station appears in a 1954 educational Encyclopædia Britannica film called The Passenger Train, produced by Milan Herzog. It also appears in the Bollywood film Kites starring Hrithik Roshan and Barbara Mori.

References

External links 

Lamy station – USA Rail Guide (TrainWeb)
The Passenger Train, 1954 (appears at 9:38)
El Ortiz Hotel (Fred Harvey Collection)

Amtrak stations in New Mexico
Atchison, Topeka and Santa Fe Railway stations
Transportation in Santa Fe County, New Mexico
Railway stations in the United States opened in 1909
Buildings and structures in Santa Fe County, New Mexico